Wan Fulin (20 November 1880 – 15 July 1951) was the military governor of Heilongjiang province from 1928 and part of the Fengtian clique. On December 29, 1928, he along with Zhang Xueliang, son of the late Zhang Zuolin, together with Zhang Zuoxiang fought against Japanese threats and coercion declared in a public wire that the four provinces of Fengtian (Liaoning), Jilin, Heilongjiang and Rehe would change the flag to that of the Republic of China and obey the National Government.

During the Mukden Incident he was in Peking, cut off from his province of Heilongjiang by the Japanese invasion of Liaoning and Jilin provinces. Zhang Xueliang promoted Ma Zhanshan Governor of Heilongjiang Province in his place. 
After the Northeastern Army retreated from the Japanese-occupied Northeast he commanded its 32nd Corps, including the 139th Division at Lengkou Pass during the Defense of the Great Wall in 1933. Afterwards, he commanded the 53rd Corps, retained in Northern China while most of the Northeastern Army was sent to Northwestern China to fight the Communists.

After the Marco Polo Bridge Incident he sent a brigade to reinforce 29th Corps during the Battle of Beiping-Tianjin. His 53rd Corps also fought in the Peking–Hankow Railway Operation and Tianjin–Pukou Railway Operation. He commanded the 26th Army in the Battle of Wuhan. During the war, he was chairman of the Liaoning province government in exile. From 1942 to 1945, he was a member of the National Military Council. He died in 1951 in Taichung county.

Career
 Jun 1928 - Aug 1928  Military governor Heilongjiang province
 Jan 1929 - Oct 1931  Chairman of the Heilongjiang province government
 Nov 1931 - 1933 Commanded 32nd Corps of Northeastern Army
 1935 - 1938 General Officer Commanding 53rd Corps
 Jul 1937 - Aug 1945  Chairman of the Liaoning (Fengtian) province government
 1937 Deputy Commander in Chief 20th Army Group
 1937 Deputy Commander in Chief 1st Army Group
 1938 General Commanding Officer 26th Army
 1942 - 1945 Member of the National Military Council

Sources 
 Hsu Long-hsuen and Chang Ming-kai, History of The Sino-Japanese War (1937–1945) 2nd Ed., 1971. Translated by Wen Ha-hsiung, Chung Wu Publishing; 33, 140th Lane, Tung-hwa Street, Taipei, Taiwan Republic of China.
  The Generals of WWII: Generals of China; Wan Fulin

National Revolutionary Army generals from Jilin
1880 births
1951 deaths
Republic of China politicians from Jilin
Politicians from Changchun
Taiwanese people from Jilin